Highland is a Capital MetroRail commuter rail station in Austin, Texas, USA. It is located in northeast Austin at the intersection of Airport Boulevard and Highland Mall Boulevard, just northwest of the I-35/Highway 290 interchange directly across the street from Highland Mall.

The station is within a 15-minute walking distance of the Austin Greyhound Terminal located at 916 E Koenig Ln, Austin, TX 78751.

This is the planned northern terminus of the Gold Line bus rapid transit.

Bus connections
The station is served by Capital MetroBus routes:
 #7 Duval/Dove Springs
 #324 Ohlen/Georgian
 #337 Koenig/Colony Park
 #350 Airport Blvd.

References

External links
 Highland station overview

Railway stations in the United States opened in 2010
Capital MetroRail stations in Austin
Railway stations in Travis County, Texas